William Clouser Boyd (March 4, 1903 – February 19, 1983) was an American immunochemist. In the 1930s, with his wife Lyle, he made a worldwide survey of the distribution of blood types.

Biography
Born in Dearborn, Missouri, Boyd was educated at Harvard and Boston University. His career led to appointment as Professor of Immunochemistry at Boston University.

Boyd's signal contribution was to discover that human blood groups are inherited and not influenced by environment. By genetic analysis of blood groups he hypothesized that human races are populations that differ by alleles. On that basis, he divided the world population into 13 geographically distinct races with different blood group gene profiles. In 1955, Boyd co-published the book Races and People with Isaac Asimov; they were both then professors at Boston University School of Medicine.

Later, Boyd coined the term lectin. He also studied the blood groups of mummies.

Boyd also wrote and published several science fiction short stories in collaboration with his wife Lyle Boyd under the name "Boyd Ellanbee"  (obviously standing for "Boyd, L and B", for Lyle and Bill).  Once in 1957 he dared Asimov to invent a science-fiction story plot on the spot, and Asimov looked at Boyd's desk calculator and came up with the premise of "The Feeling of Power".

Boyd's papers were donated to the National Library of Medicine by Mrs. Cassandra Boyd in 1983.

Selected bibliography
 Races and People, by Isaac Asimov and William C Boyd, 1955.
 Genetics and the races of man: An introduction to modern physical anthropology, William C Boyd, 1950.

References

External links
 
 
 

1903 births
1983 deaths
Harvard University alumni
Boston University alumni
20th-century American chemists
Boston University faculty
People from Missouri
Chemists from Missouri
20th-century American male writers